The Coastal Road is an under construction 8-lane, 29.2-km long grade separated expressway that would run along Mumbai's western coastline connecting Marine Lines in the south to Kandivali in the north. It is projected to be used by 130,000 vehicles daily, and is expected to reduce travel time between South Mumbai and the Western Suburbs from 2 hours to only 40 minutes. Its first phase, which is under-construction, is a 9.98 km section from Princess Street flyover to the Worli end of the Bandra-Worli Sea Link.

Planning 
Wilbur Smith and Associates, commissioned in 1962 to study transportation in Mumbai, recommended construction of a 3.6 km road between Haji Ali and Nariman Point on reclaimed land and 1.04 km tunnel under Malabar Hill up to Girgaum Chowpatty. Smith's report also proposed connectors to Walkeshwar Road and Chowpatty. However, the proposed road was not built. In 2011, Maharashtra Chief Minister Prithviraj Chavan proposed the Coastal Road as an alternative to the plan for the Western Freeway. Chavan asked the MSRDC to think of building coastal roads instead of capital intensive sea links. He appointed a Joint Technical Committee, comprising experts and officials, in 2012 under the then municipal commissioner Subodh Kumar to study the plan to build a coastal road. In its report, submitted in January 2012, the committee advised the government to build a 35.6 km coastal freeway from Manora MLA Hostel at Nariman Point to Kandivali to ease traffic congestion. The project was estimated to cost  and would have consisted of roads built on reclaimed land as well as stilts, bridges and tunnels. The committee was against building any more sea links and pointed out that the coastal road would help save  of public money.

The 35.6 km road was proposed to begin near Manora (MLA Hostel), with entry and exit points at Jagannath Bhosale Marg, move along Marine Drive and lead into a tunnel that would go under Malabar Hill and exit on the other side of Priyadarshini Park. This stretch was proposed to be built on reclaimed portions up to Haji Ali, and then to Lala Lajpatrai Road in Worli. The coastal freeway would then be connected to the Worli arm of the Bandra-Worli Sea Link by a bridge. On the Bandra side, the coastal road skirting the fort would connect the coastal freeway up to Chimbai village, where a bridge was proposed. A road by reclamation of mangroves, further north, or a road on stilts, and an elevated road between Oshiwara and Malad was also proposed. The proposed freeway would have had 18 entry and exit points along its route. The project is estimated to cost —, and take 5 years to complete. Critics of the freeway opposed it due to the reclamation required and have also cited possible environmental degradation along the coast.

Coastal Regulation Zone (CRZ) norms in India disallow reclamation of land. Construction of the coastal freeway would require a relaxation of the CRZ norms, as certain sections are proposed on reclaimed land. The change in norms can only be done through an amendment to the law by the Central Government. After discussing the project on 10 April 2013, the Maharashtra Coastal Zone Management Authority (MCZMA), the state's apex environment body, urged the centre to amend the CRZ notification to permit "reclamation for roads". The MCZMA stated that reclamation should not be permitted for any other development activity and that the high tide line must not be altered. The MCZMA also argued that the ring road would serve as a protection wall from inland flooding, besides being a vital road link for decongesting traffic. During a meeting between Prithviraj Chavan and Union Environment Minister Jayanthi Natarajan on 20 June 2013, Natarajan expressed concerns about the implications of relaxing CRZ norms on creeks and mangroves. However, the minister stated that she would "put the state's proposal at the next meeting [24 June 2013] of the National Coastal Zone Management Authority". However, despite specific assurance from the minister, the National Coastal Zone Management Authority (NCZMA) decided not to include the coastal road plan in their next meeting's agenda.

During the 2014 assembly elections, the BJP promised to implement the project if elected. The project was modified and fast tracked after the party came to power. On 6 June 2015, the State Government signed an MoU with the Dutch Government for technical co-operation in implementing the project. The Netherlands is known for its environment-friendly reclamation and the use of the sea. On 8 June 2015, the coastal road project received clearance from the Union Ministry of Environment and Forests.

Shiv Sena president Uddhav Thackeray stated on 26 November 2016 that a survey of the soil at the seabed was being undertaken. The project received final clearance from the Ministry of Environment, Forest and Climate Change on 11 May 2017. The foundation stone for the project was laid at Amarsons Garden in Cumballa Hill on 16 December 2018.

The Environment Ministry asked the BMC to deposit 2% of the total project cost with the Mangrove Cell, a state government organization tasked with conserving mangroves.

Construction 
The Coastal Road will be built in two phases. It will have 8 lanes, including 2 lanes dedicated for a bus rapid transit system. AECOM is the project's General Consultant. A CRCHI slurry tunnel boring machine for the Priyadarshini Park - Marine Drive section arrived in Mumbai on April 26, 2020.

Phase I
The first phase of the project is a 9.98 km section from Princess Street Flyover at Marine Lines to the Worli end of the Bandra-Worli Sea Link (BWSL).

The Brihanmumbai Municipal Corporation awarded contracts for the project in four packages in October 2018. Package 1 includes the construction of a 3.82 km long section over reclaimed land from Priyadarshini Park to Baroda Palace and interchanges at Amarson Garden and Haji Ali. Package 4 includes the construction of a 3.93 km section from Princess Street flyover to Priyadarshini Park, including the up and down ramps from Marine Drive connecting to the twin tunnels passing below Girgaum Chowpatty, Malabar Hills, and exit at Priyadarshini Park to connect with section in Package 1. Packages 2 and 3 involves a bridge spanning 0.9 km, an interchange, a 3.2-km-long ramp and a 1.9-km embankment between Baroda Palace near Haji Ali and the Worli end of Bandra-Worli Sea Link.

Construction on the project began in October 2018, and was expected to be completed in 2022. Nine petitioners moved the Bombay High Court seeking to halt construction alleging that land reclamation was illegal and would irreversibly alter the coastal environment. On 16 April 2019, the High Court ordered all construction activities on the project to be halted until 3 June 2019. On 26 April 2019, the BMC appealed the order in the Supreme Court. On 6 May, the Supreme Court permitted contractors to continue work in areas where construction had already begun but prohibited beginning work in any new areas pending the Bombay High Court's decision in June 2019. Contractors resumed piling work at Amarsons Garden within hours of the Supreme Court decision. BMC officials stated on 14 May that round-the-clock construction had resumed  at all project sites covered by the Supreme Court's order. The agency had already begun construction activities for about 17% of the total work on Phase I. The work includes construction of a sea wall, site offices for engineers, and pits for construction of the two tunnels. The BMC stated that it had expected to complete this work before the start of the monsoon season and had planned to pause construction during the monsoon to reduce impact on marine life. Due to the delays caused by the Court case, the agency stated that it would continue construction throughout the monsoon season whenever it was possible to do so without impacting marine life.

The BMC filed affidavits in response to the petitions challenging the project in the High Court on 3 June. The Court commenced hearings on the petitions from 17 June. The BMC stated that it had received all necessary environmental approvals related to the project. The Court reserved judgment on the public interest litigations on 1 July, and will commence final hearings on 17 July 2019. On 16 July, the Bombay High Court cancelled the approval granted by MCZMA and by the MoEF to the Coastal Road project citing a lack of "proper scientific study". The Court ruled that the MCGM could not proceed with construction until they obtained an environmental clearance after a proper Environmental Impact Assessment was conducted, and the MCZMA would require permission under the Wildlife Protection Act, 1972. On 27 July, the Supreme Court refused to stay the High Court's order halting construction on the project. However, the Supreme Court agreed to hear the MCGM's plea seeking interim relief on 20 August.

The BMC administration informed corporators on 21 August that work had been completely halted since 16 July. The agency stated that it had completed 6.25% of the total work on the project and had spent . The BMC also stated that it had planned to complete 12.56% of the work at this stage but was unable to do so due to the legal hurdles. Contractors began decommissioning machinery and equipment from work sites in September 2019. BMC chief Praveen Pardeshi stated that work would only resume after the Supreme Court verdict. Hindustan Times quoted an unnamed BMC official as stating that the machinery was being removed from the Tata Garden area to facilitate the filming of the Hollywood film Tenet. On 17 December 2019, the Supreme Court placed a stay on the High Court order and permitted the Coastal Road project to continue. However, the Court prohibited authorities from carrying out any construction work other than that required for the road itself, which would affect the BMC's plans to develop parks and gardens adjacent to the road.

Phase 2
Work on the second phase, a 19.22 km road between the Bandra end of the BWSL and Kandivali, will be constructed by MSRDC. The phase includes the 9.5 km Versova-Bandra Sea Link.

Alignment
The Coastal Road will begin from the traffic signal near Wankhede Stadium south of Princess Street flyover. A two lane road will be constructed from the traffic signal near the Stadium for north-bound traffic. A portion of the existing C-shaped promenade will be utilized to construct the road, and a new 1-km long and 8–10 meters wide promenade will be built to compensate for the loss pedestrian space due to project. The new promenade will run parallel to Coastal Road, on its seaward side, go over the tunnel near Charni Road station and continue north along the alignment providing a contiguous pedestrian walkway from the NCPA to Girgaum Chowpatty. The promenade will be constructed on a cantilever bridge ensuring that sea waves can flow without colliding with the structure. It will also prevent the tides from washing over the promenade as is common on the existing Marine Drive during the monsoon season.

The two-lane road for north-bound traffic from Wankhede Stadium will enter into a tunnel near Charni Road station. On the opposite side of the road, two lanes for southbound traffic emerge from the tunnel and merge onto the existing service road outside Wilson Gymkhana. The project will occupy a portion of the Gymkhana grounds and reduce the existing service road to a 6.6 metre wide single-lane service road with a footpath. The tunnels run under Malabar Hill, after which the Coastal Road continues north and emerges above ground. The highway passes over a bridge near Samudra Mahal building, continues on reclaimed land before passing over another bridge over the Worli Nullah. The Coastal Road continues north on reclaimed land and a small sea link connects it with the Worli end of the Bandra-Worli Sea Link.

This Coastal Road will also include interchanges at Haji Ali, Breach Candy, Amarsons Garden, Worli, and Bandra.

The Haji Ali interchange is a multi-level structure with four feeder roads to facilitate access to the Coastal Road from any direction of approach to the Haji Ali signal. Two arms of interchange cross over each other at a height of 24 metres above sea level. The Breach Candy interchange had four ramps all connecting to Bhulabhai Desai Road (also called Warden Road).

Timeline

July 2021: 90% of the land required for the project was acquired by Brihanmumbai Municipal Corporation (BMC). This extended the road one hundred metres inside the Arabian Sea. The boring machine completed the digging of 500 metres of coastal road.
September 2021: BMC completes 1-km tunnel boring for project.
September 2021: 40% work completed for coastal road project, and is expected to be fully operational by November 2023, as of 23 September.
December 2021: BMC completes 2-km tunnel boring for the project.
January 2022: BMC fully completes the tunnel boring for the project.
July 2022: The project is now 58% completed, and is expected to be completed by November 2023.

See also
 Bandra-Worli Sea Link

References

External links 
 https://portal.mcgm.gov.in/irj/portal/anonymous/qlcoastal1?guest_user=english

Expressways in Maharashtra
Roads in Mumbai
Proposed infrastructure in Maharashtra
Proposed expressways in India